Planet Unicorn is an American computer-animated cartoon series created by Mike Rose and Tyler Spiers for the webseries screening contest Channel 101.  The fictional stories revolve around three talking unicorns - Feathers, Cadillac, and Tom Cruise - who were created by an 8-year-old gay boy named Shannon.

Characters

Episode list 
 Episode 1: The unicorns encounter Shannon for the first time and thwart a threat to their environment. We learn of Tom Cruise's special ability.
 Episode 2: The unicorns discover the importance of expressing emotions.
 Episode 3: A trip to the sea proves dangerous. Cadillac's special ability is revealed.
 Episode 4: Vanity threatens to ruin the unicorns' friendship.
 Episode 5: Shannon's new friend comes between him and the unicorns.  Feathers displays his special ability.
 Episode 6: The unicorns learn about Christmas and fill in for Santa's reindeer, while the reindeer explore Planet Unicorn.

Trivia
The series is a production for Channel 101, where it lasted six episodes before being cancelled by the live audience, and was also distributed through MySpace.

The show has been featured on NPR's Day to Day show, in Out (August 2007), Time Out New York (August 2007), and was named as one of New York'''s 20 Funniest Web Videos of 2007. The creators have also been interviewed on Red Eye w/ Greg Gutfeld''. The show received the 2008 "OMFG Internet" award from the Logo Channel.

References

External links
 Tyler Spiers
 Channel 101 Show Page

2007 web series debuts
Channel 101
Works about unicorns
2000s American adult animated television series
American adult animated comedy television series
American adult animated web series
Animated television series about children